Leslie Lyle Gutches (born February 21, 1973, Medford, Oregon) is an American former amateur wrestler and coach.  His accomplishments include becoming world champion in freestyle wrestling at the 1997 World Wrestling Championships, the Dan Hodge Trophy as the nation's best college wrestler in 1996, becoming the National Collegiate Athletic Association (NCAA) champion in the 177 lb. weight division in both 1995 and 1996, earning All-American status in 1994, 1995 & 1996, becoming a member of the 1996 United States Olympics freestyle wrestling team, and winning numerous other tournaments and honors.

Youth
Gutches grew up in a family of wrestlers with his father Les Senior, a retired Fire Captain, being the first Gutches state champion.  Les's siblings are Jason, a chiropractor and Chad, a home builder. Les Gutches grew up in Southern Oregon and has the unique distinction of winning national championships in all of the wrestling age groups, including three state titles while a student at South Medford High School.

College
Considered the university's best wrestler in modern history with a 134–10 record, Gutches had a tremendous collegiate wrestling career as a four-year letterman of the Oregon State Beavers wrestling team, culminating in winning the Dan Hodge Trophy as the best college wrestler in the United States in 1996.  He placed 5th at the NCAA championships in 1994, and went on to win the title in both 1995 and 1996, years in which he was undefeated with an identical 69–0 record. This earned him All-American status each of the three years, which is awarded to the top 8 athletes in each weight class every year.

He graduated from Oregon State University with a Bachelor's degree in Physical Anthropology and a minor in German Language in 1996. He was also a three-time NCAA First-Team Academic All-American as an undergraduate.

International
Gutches achieved his greatest accomplishment in 1997, when he won the gold medal in Freestyle Wrestling at the 32nd FILA Wrestling World Championships against Ukrainian Eldar Assanov in Krasnoyarsk. Gutches again medalled in 1999, when he won the bronze.

Other gold medal first-place finishes at international competitions were at the 1999 FILA Wrestling World Cup, the 1999 Pan American Games, and the 1998 Goodwill Games.

He was also a 1996 Olympian.

Coaching
Gutches was a full-time assistant coach at Oregon State from 1996 to 1999, a volunteer coach in 2001, and again a full-time assistant coach in 2002–2006, coaching five wrestlers to All-American honors.

He was also an assistant coach for the United States National Team at the 2002 Freestyle World Cup, his team winning the title that year.

Personal
In January 2010, it was announced that Gutches had been named the Director of Program Development for USA Wrestling.  He was promoted to Associate Executive Director for Programs and Strategy in October 2012.  Previously, he worked as a Commercial Loan Officer at Citizens Bank for  four years, and lived in the Corvallis, Oregon region with his wife, the former Jennifer Busen, who played basketball at Oregon State.  They presently live in Colorado Springs, Colorado with their daughter Alexis and son Logan. Gutches is one of the three founders of G3 Sports Performance Center in Corvallis, Oregon.

Accomplishments

Gutches has won numerous wrestling tournaments, awards and honors, including:
1989 USA Junior Greco-Roman Championships (178 lb): 1st
1989 USA Cadet Greco-Roman Championships (182.5 lb): 1st
1991 FILA Junior World Greco-Roman Champion (198 lb): 1st
1992 FILA Junior World Freestyle Championships (198 lb): 1st
1993 FILA Junior World Freestyle Championships (180.5 lb): 1st
1993 USA University Freestyle Championships (180.5 lb): 1st
1994 USA University Freestyle Championships (180.5 lb): 1st
1994 NCAA Division I Collegiate Championships (177 lb): 5th
1994 NCAA Division I All-American (177 lb)
1995 NCAA Division I Collegiate Championships (177 lb): 1st
1995 NCAA Division I All-American (177 lb)
1996 NCAA Division I Collegiate Championships (177 lb): 1st (Outstanding Wrestler)
1996 NCAA Division I All-American (177 lb)
1996 Dan Hodge Trophy winner
1996 US Olympic Team Freestyle results (180.5 lb): 7th
1996 USA Senior Freestyle Championships (180.5 lb): 1st (Outstanding Wrestler)
1997 USA Senior Freestyle Championships (187.2 lb): 1st
1997 FILA World Championships (187 lb): 1st
1997 Athlete of the Year by the United States Olympic Committee
1998 USA Senior Freestyle Championships (187.2 lb): 1st (Outstanding Wrestler)
1998 Goodwill Games Freestyle Wrestling (187 lb): 1st
1998 FILA World Championships (187 lb): 7th
1999 Yasar Dogu Tournament (187.25 lb): 1st
1999 USA Senior Freestyle Championships (187.2 lb): 1st
1999 Pan American Games (187.2 lb): 1st
1999 FILA World Championships (187 lb): 3rd
2000 USA Senior Freestyle Championships (187.2 lb): 1st

Hall of Fame inductions
2003 Oregon State University Sports Hall of Fame
2009 National Wrestling Hall of Fame
2011 Oregon Sports Hall of Fame
2012 Medford Sports Hall of Fame

References

External links
 Les Gutches - Distinguished Member - at the National Wrestling Hall of Fame
 Les Gutches - Inductee at the Oregon Sports Hall of Fame

1973 births
Living people
Wrestlers at the 1996 Summer Olympics
American male sport wrestlers
Olympic wrestlers of the United States
Wrestlers at the 1999 Pan American Games
Pan American Games gold medalists for the United States
Oregon State Beavers wrestlers
American wrestling coaches
Oregon State Beavers wrestling coaches
Sportspeople from Colorado Springs, Colorado
Sportspeople from Corvallis, Oregon
Sportspeople from Medford, Oregon
Wrestlers from Oregon
Pan American Games medalists in wrestling
World Wrestling Championships medalists
Goodwill Games medalists in wrestling
Competitors at the 1998 Goodwill Games
Medalists at the 1999 Pan American Games
20th-century American people